The eastern greenish yellow bat (Scotophilus viridis) is a species of vesper bat. It is found in Botswana, Central African Republic, Eswatini, Ethiopia, Kenya, Malawi, Mozambique, South Africa, Tanzania, Zambia, and Zimbabwe. Its natural habitats are  dry and moist savanna. 

The western greenish yellow bat (S. nigritellus) of western Africa was formerly considered conspecific.

References

Scotophilus
Taxonomy articles created by Polbot
Mammals described in 1852
Taxa named by Wilhelm Peters
Bats of Africa